Michael McGovern (born 12 July 1984) is a Northern Irish professional footballer who plays as a goalkeeper for  club Norwich City and the Northern Ireland national team.

Born in Enniskillen, McGovern started his career with Scottish Premier League club Celtic in 2001. He spent time on loan with Scottish Second Division side Stranraer in 2005 and with Scottish First Division side St Johnstone in 2006. He left Celtic in 2008, having never made a first-team appearance for the club. After leaving Celtic, he joined fellow Scottish Premier League side Dundee United, but left after one season having not made a first-team appearance. In 2009, he went back to the First Division with Ross County, where he enjoyed a successful two-year spell. In 2011, he moved on a free transfer to fellow First Division side Falkirk. McGovern then moved to Hamilton Academical in 2014. After spending 15 years playing in Scotland, he moved to English club Norwich City in July 2016.

McGovern represented Northern Ireland at under-19 and under-21 levels, before making his senior debut in May 2010. He represented Northern Ireland at UEFA Euro 2016.

Club career

Celtic
McGovern joined Celtic in July 2001 from hometown junior club Enniskillen Town United. His first involvement with the first-team squad was as a substitute at the Camp Nou during Celtic's UEFA Cup match against Barcelona in March 2004. In January 2005, McGovern joined Stranraer on loan. He joined St Johnstone on a one-month emergency loan in December 2006. While at Celtic, he managed to pick up a Scottish Cup winners medal in 2004 and 2007, both times as an unused substitute.

Dundee United
On 17 June 2008, McGovern agreed a pre-contract move to Dundee United, signing a one-year deal. He failed to make a first-team appearance for United and manager Craig Levein confirmed McGovern's departure in May 2009.

Ross County
McGovern moved to Ross County in late June 2009 and enjoyed a successful first season. This included playing in the 2010 Scottish Cup Final, which Ross County lost 3–0 to McGovern's former club Dundee United, and making his full international debut.

In his second season at the club, McGovern saved two penalties in a 4–3 penalty shoot-out win against Partick Thistle in the Scottish Challenge Cup semi-final on 10 October 2010. He played in the final on 10 April 2011, as Ross County lifted the trophy after a 2–0 win against Queen of the South at McDiarmid Park. McGovern left Ross County at the end of the 2010–11 Scottish First Division season.

Falkirk
After leaving Ross County, McGovern joined up with St Johnstone for pre-season training before he signed for Falkirk on 20 July 2011. He quickly established himself as first choice goalkeeper and on 21 September 2011, played in Falkirk's 3–2 Scottish League Cup win over holders Rangers. On 1 April 2012, he played for Falkirk in their 1–0 win over Hamilton in the 2012 Scottish Challenge Cup Final. At the end of the season he won the Falkirk Players' Player of the Year award and Falkirk Supporters Club Player of the Year award. He was among four players nominated for the PFA Scotland First Division Player of the Year award and he was named in the PFA Scotland 2012–13 First Division Team of the Year. On 17 May 2012, he signed a new one-year contract.

McGovern was named Falkirk Players' Player of the Year for the second year in succession at the end of the 2012–13 season. He signed a new one-year deal at Falkirk on 24 June 2013 and was appointed club captain upon the departure of Darren Dods. On 18 April 2014, McGovern was named in the PFA Scotland 2013–14 Championship Team of the Year.

Hamilton Academical
On 9 June 2014, McGovern signed for Scottish Premiership club Hamilton Academical on a one-year contract. He made his debut on 2 August 2014, in a 2–1 win against Arbroath in the Scottish League Cup. On 5 October 2014, he played in Hamilton Academical's 1–0 victory over Celtic, which was their first victory at Celtic Park in 76 years. During September and October 2014, McGovern set a club record of 437 minutes without conceding a goal in the Scottish top flight. On 28 November 2014, he extended his contract at Hamilton Academical by a further year, until 2016. In January 2015, McGovern became club captain after the incumbent Martin Canning was promoted to manager following Alex Neil's departure to Norwich City.

Norwich City
On 19 July 2016, it was revealed that McGovern had signed for Championship club Norwich City on a three-year deal. He made his debut on 13 August 2016, replacing John Ruddy at half-time in Norwich City's 0–0 draw with Sheffield Wednesday.

International career
In March 2008, McGovern received his first call-up to the Northern Ireland squad. McGovern made his full debut for Northern Ireland on 31 May 2010, in a 1–0 loss to Chile. He came on at half-time for Alan Blayney and made a "stunning" save from a long-range effort by Marco Estrada.

McGovern had to wait until 2015 for his second cap, after which he quickly became the number one goalkeeper for Northern Ireland, helping them qualify for Euro 2016 as qualifying group winners. He received plaudits for a series of "heroic saves" that restricted Germany to a 1–0 win during the group stages of the Euro 2016 finals on 21 June 2016, keeping Northern Ireland's goal difference down and helping them qualify for the knockout round of 16.

Career statistics

Club

International

Honours
Celtic
Scottish Cup: 2003–04, 2006–07

Ross County
Scottish Challenge Cup: 2010–11
Scottish Cup runner-up: 2009–10

Falkirk
Scottish Challenge Cup: 2011–12

Norwich City
EFL Championship: 2020–21

References

External links

Profile at Irish FA

1984 births
Living people
People from Enniskillen
Association footballers from Northern Ireland
Northern Ireland youth international footballers
Northern Ireland under-21 international footballers
Northern Ireland international footballers
Association football goalkeepers
Celtic F.C. players
Stranraer F.C. players
St Johnstone F.C. players
Dundee United F.C. players
Ross County F.C. players
Falkirk F.C. players
Hamilton Academical F.C. players
Norwich City F.C. players
Scottish Football League players
Scottish Professional Football League players
Premier League players
UEFA Euro 2016 players